The gens Aponia was a Roman family during the later Republic, and the 1st century of the Empire.  The gens is known from only a few individuals.

Members of the gens
 Quintus Aponius, one of the commanders under Trebonius, Caesar's lieutenant in Hispania.
 Gaius Aponius Mutilus, apparently confused with Gaius Papius Mutilus, a Samnite leader during the Social War, in the history of Diodorus Siculus.
 Marcus Aponius Saturninus, governor of Moesia at the death of Nero, first espoused the cause of Vitellius, but deserted him for Vespasian.

See also
 List of Roman gentes

References

 
Roman gentes